San Cayetano (Saint Cajetan in English) was a Catholic saint (1480-1547), and may refer to:

 San Cayetano, Buenos Aires, capital of San Cayetano Partido, Buenos Aires Province
San Cayetano Partido, its partido
 San Cayetano, Norte de Santander, Colombia
 San Cayetano, Cundinamarca, Colombia